The following is a list of notable deaths in August 2011.

Entries for each day are listed alphabetically by surname. A typical entry lists information in the following sequence:
 Name, age, country of citizenship at birth, subsequent country of citizenship (if applicable), reason for notability, cause of death (if known), and reference.

August 2011

1
Concha Alós, 85, Spanish writer.
Stan Barstow, 83, English novelist.
Joe Caffie, 80, American baseball player (Cleveland Indians, Cleveland Buckeyes).
Carmela Marie Cristiano, 83, American Roman Catholic nun (Sisters of Charity of Saint Elizabeth), first nun to seek political office in New Jersey.
*Florentina Gómez Miranda, 99, Argentine lawyer and women's rights activist.
Gamini Goonesena, 80, Sri Lankan cricketer.
Chieko N. Okazaki, 84, American Mormon women's leader, first non-Caucasian woman to hold a senior position in the LDS church, heart failure.
Ken Payne, 60, American football player (Green Bay Packers).
Alex Pitko, 97, American baseball player.
Zhanna Prokhorenko, 71, Russian film actress (Ballad of a Soldier).

2
Leslie Esdaile Banks, 51, American author (The Vampire Huntress Legend Series), adrenal cancer.
Baruj Benacerraf, 90, Venezuelan-born American immunologist, Nobel laureate (1980).
Ralph Berkowitz, 100, American composer.
Igor Chepusov, 61, Soviet and American producer, script writer and director.
Meldric Daluz, 90, Indian Olympic gold medal-winning (1952) field hockey player.
Al Federoff, 87, American baseball player (Detroit Tigers).
Asadullo Gulomov, 58, Tajik politician, Deputy Prime Minister (since 2006).
Andrey Kapitsa, 80, Russian geographer and explorer, discovered and named Lake Vostok.
Clarence E. Miller, 93, American politician, U.S. Representative from Ohio (1967–1993), pneumonia.
Attilio Pavesi, 100, Italian Olympic cyclist, oldest living Olympic champion.
Richard Pearson, 93, Welsh actor (The Yellow Rolls-Royce).
*José Sanchis Grau, 79, Spanish comic book artist.
James Ford Seale, 76, American murderer, Ku Klux Klan member.
Markku Yli-Isotalo, 58, Finnish Olympic wrestler

3
Rudolf Brazda, 98, German concentration camp prisoner, last known survivor of pink triangle homosexual deportation.
Richard Cates, 85, American lawyer.
Annette Charles, 63, American actress (Grease), complications of lung cancer.
Antonio Diaz, 83, Filipino politician, Representative from Zambales (1969–1972, 1992–2001, 2004–2011).
Jackie Hudson, 76, American nun and peace activist.
Ingrid Luterkort, 101, Swedish actress.
Andrew McDermott, 45, British singer (Threshold), complications of kidney failure.
Simona Monyová, 44, Czech writer, stabbed.
Ray Patterson, 89, American basketball executive (Milwaukee Bucks, Houston Rockets).
Nikolai Arnoldovich Petrov, 68, Russian pianist, People's Artist of the USSR, stroke.
José Ignacio Rivero, 90, Cuban journalist.
William Sleator, 66, American science fiction writer (Interstellar Pig).
Bubba Smith, 66, American football player (Baltimore Colts) and actor (Police Academy, Stroker Ace).
Mohsen Koochebaghi Tabrizi, 87, Iranian Shi'ite Muslim marja, heart attack.
Allan Watkins, 89, Welsh cricketer, after short illness.

4
David B. Barrett, 83, American professor.
Alan Blackshaw, 78, English mountaineer and civil servant, cancer.
Michael Bukht, 69, British radio executive, television personality and chef who worked as Michael Barry.
Mark Duggan, 29, British crime suspect, shot.
Naoki Matsuda, 34, Japanese footballer (Yokohama F. Marinos, national team), suspected heart attack.
Conrad Schnitzler, 74, German musician (Tangerine Dream, Kluster, Eruption, Berlin Express), stomach cancer.
Erika Thijs, 51, Belgian politician, Senator (since 1995), cancer.
Sherman White, 82, American basketball player (Long Island University).

5
Jean-Claude Bajeux, 79, Haitian activist and scholar, lung cancer.
Gerry Davidson, 90, American masters athlete, stroke.
Erol Erduran, 78, Cypriot educator and writer.
Dudley E. Faver, 94, American Air Force major general and academic.
Marion D. Hanks, 89, American Mormon leader.
Grahame Jarratt, 82, New Zealand rower.
Hazel Johnson-Brown, 83, American Army nurse and general, Alzheimer's disease.
Andrzej Lepper, 57, Polish politician, suspected suicide by hanging.
Elphas Mukonoweshuro, 58, Zimbabwean academic and politician.
Gary Nixon, 70, American motorcycle racer, complications from a heart attack.
Francesco Quinn, 48, Italian-born American actor (Platoon, Transformers: Dark of the Moon, The Shield), heart attack.
Aziz Shavershian, 22, Australian bodybuilder and model, heart attack.
Adi Talmor, 58, Israeli journalist and news presenter, assisted suicide.
Stan Willemse, 86, British footballer (Chelsea).

6
Bernadine Healy, 67, American cardiologist, director of the National Institutes of Health (1991–1993), brain cancer.
Fred Imus, 69, American songwriter and radio talk show host, brother of Don Imus.
Kuno Klötzer, 89, German football coach.
Fe del Mundo, 99, Filipino pediatrician, National Scientist of the Philippines, heart attack.
Roman Opałka, 79, French-born Polish painter.
John W. Ryan, 81, American academic administrator, President of Indiana University (1971–1987).
Jerry Smith, 80, American football player (San Francisco 49ers) and coach (Denver Broncos).
John Wood, 81, English actor (WarGames, Chocolat, Sabrina).

7
Eric Anthony Abrahams, 71, Jamaican public servant.
Joseph Candolfi, 89, Swiss Roman Catholic prelate, Auxiliary Bishop of Basel (1983–1996).
Hugh Carey, 92, American politician, Governor of New York (1975–1982) and U.S. Representative (1961–1974).
Rocco Colonna, 77, American politician, Member of the Ohio House of Representatives (1975–1988).
Charles Coventry, 52, Zimbabwean cricket umpire.
Cornelius Elanjikal, 92, Indian Roman Catholic prelate, Archbishop of Verapoly (1987–1996).
Eddie Gibbins, 85, English footballer.
Marshall Grant, 83, American double bassist (Tennessee Two).
F. M. Hardacre, 96, American academic and college football coach.
Mark Hatfield, 89, American politician, Governor of Oregon (1959–1967) and U.S. Senator (1967–1997).
Harri Holkeri, 74, Finnish politician, Prime Minister (1987–1991), after long illness.
Paul Meier, 87, American mathematician (Kaplan–Meier estimator), complications from a stroke.
George Naghi, 59, Romanian businessman, founder of Aldis SRL, boating accident.
Tom Radney, 79, American politician, member of the Alabama Senate (1967–1971), after long illness.
Jiří Traxler, 99, Czech-born Canadian jazz pianist.
Nancy Wake, 98, New Zealand-born Australian French Resistance leader, chest infection.
Charles Wyly, 77, American businessman and philanthropist, co-founder of Michaels Stores, automobile accident.
Joe Yamanaka, 64, Japanese rock singer, lung cancer.

8
Neal Abberley, 67, English cricketer, heart and lung condition.
Ray Anderson, 77, American entrepreneur, cancer.
Mike Barrett, 67, American Olympic and professional basketball player (Virginia Squires, San Diego Conquistadors).
Ruth Brinker, 89, American AIDS and nutrition activist, founder of Project Open Hand, vascular dementia.
Royal Copeland, 86, Canadian football player (Toronto Argonauts), Alzheimer's disease.
Cem Erman, 64, Turkish actor and composer.
Fred Ingaldson, 78, Canadian Olympic basketball player.
Kurt Johansson, 97, Swedish Olympic sport shooter.
Anastasios Peponis, 87, Greek politician and author, heart problems.
Federico Richter Fernandez-Prada, 89, Peruvian Roman Catholic prelate, Archbishop of Ayacucho/Huamanga (1979–1991).
Hind Rostom, 81, Egyptian actress, heart attack.
Jiřina Švorcová, 83, Czech actress and pro-Communist activist.
Harry H. Wellington, 84, American lawyer, Dean of Yale Law School (1975–1985) and New York Law School (1992–2000), brain tumor.
Guillermo Zarur, 79, Mexican actor, complications of kidney and heart disease.

9
Wendy Babcock, 32, Canadian advocate for the rights of prostitutes, suspected suicide.
Roberto Busa, 97, Italian Jesuit priest, pioneer in Digital Humanities.
Adolphe-Maria Gustave Hardy, 91, French Roman Catholic prelate, Bishop of Beauvais (1985–1995).
Yoshihiro Hamaguchi, 85, Japanese Olympic swimmer, heart failure.
Jimmy Harris, 76, American football player (University of Oklahoma, Dallas Cowboys, Philadelphia Eagles), natural causes.
Kolapo Ishola, 77, Nigerian politician, Governor of Oyo State (1991–1993).
Eleanor Josaitis, 79, American activist, co-founder of Focus: HOPE, peritoneal cancer.
Julian Kenny, 81, Trinidadian zoologist, environmentalist and politician, Senator (1995–2001).
Mimi Lee, 91, American chemist, First Lady of Maryland (1977–1979), heart failure.
Werner W. Wallroth, 81, German film director.

10
P. C. Alexander, 90, Indian politician, Governor of Tamil Nadu (1988–1990), Maharashtra (1993–2002) and Goa (1996–1998).
Moraíto Chico II, 54, Spanish musician, cancer.
Arnaud Desjardins, 86, French philosopher.
Norton Fredrick, 73, Sri Lankan cricketer, illness.
Billy Grammer, 85, American country singer.
Selwyn Griffith, 83, Welsh poet.
Oldřich Machač, 65, Czech Olympic silver (1968, 1976) and bronze (1972) medal-winning ice hockey player, heart failure.
Babak Masoumi, 39, Iranian futsal player and coach, blood cancer.
Lilia Michel, 85, Mexican actress.
Mark Sinyangwe, 31, Zambian footballer.

11
*Agustín Romualdo Álvarez Rodríguez, 88, Spanish-born Venezuelan Roman Catholic prelate, Vicar Apostolic of Machiques (1986–1995).
V. R. Athavale, 92, Indian singer.
Robert Breer, 84, American experimental filmmaker.
Don Chandler, 76, American football player (New York Giants, Green Bay Packers).
George Devol, 99, American inventor, creator of Unimate, the first industrial robot.
Karen Drambjan, 57, Armenian-born Estonian activist, shot.
Ignacio Flores, 58, Mexican football player (Cruz Azul, national team), shot.
Mateo Flores, 89, Guatemalan Olympic athlete.
Noach Flug, 86, Polish-born Israeli economist, advocate for rights of Holocaust survivors.
Richard Floyd, 80, American politician and lawmaker.
Clair George, 81, American CIA officer (Iran–Contra affair), cardiac arrest.
David Holbrook, 88, English writer and academic.
Jani Lane, 47, American musician (Warrant).
Scott LeDoux, 62, American boxer, amyotrophic lateral sclerosis.
Karen Overington, 59, Australian politician, Victorian MLA for Ballarat West (1999–2010).
Bob Shamansky, 84, American politician, U.S. Representative from Ohio (1981–1983).
Johann Traxler, 52, Austrian Olympic cyclist.
Joe Trimble, 80, American baseball player (Boston Red Sox, Pittsburgh Pirates).
Paul Wilkinson, 74, British academic, expert on the study of terrorism (University of St Andrews).
Bob Will, 80, American baseball player (Chicago Cubs).

12
Patricia Acioli, 47, Brazilian judge and feminist, shot.
Austin-Emile Burke, 89, Canadian Roman Catholic prelate, Archbishop of Halifax (1991–1998).
Ernie Johnson, 87, American baseball player (Boston Braves/Milwaukee Braves, Baltimore Orioles) and broadcaster (Atlanta Braves).
Karl Kittsteiner, 91, German cyclist and National Champion (1946).
Charles P. Murray, Jr., 89, American Army colonel, Medal of Honor recipient, heart failure.
Robert Robinson, 83, English radio and television presenter.
*Francisco Solano López, 83, Argentine comics artist (El Eternauta), complications from a stroke.
Pierpaolo Spangaro, 69, Italian Olympic swimmer.

13
Álvaro Lara, 26, Chilean footballer, traffic collision.
Chris Lawrence, 78, British racing driver and engineer, cancer.
Ctirad Mašín, 81, Czech resistance fighter.
Tareque Masud, 54, Bangladeshi independent film director, traffic collision.
Mishuk Munier, 52, Bangladeshi journalist, photography director, media specialist and cinematographer, traffic collision.
Jesús del Pozo, 65, Spanish fashion designer, pulmonary emphysema.
Topi Sorsakoski, 58, Finnish singer, lung cancer.
Ellen Winther, 78, Danish opera singer and actress.

14
Fritz Bach, 77, Austrian-born American transplant physician and immunologist.
Jonathan Bacon, 30, American gangster, shot.
Albert Brown, 105, American World War II veteran, oldest survivor of Bataan Death March.
Kase2 (Jeff Brown), 52, graffiti writer and contributor to the hip-hop movement.
Yekaterina Golubeva, 44, Russian actress.
Shammi Kapoor, 79, Indian film actor and director, renal failure.
Fritz Korbach, 66, German football player and manager, laryngeal cancer.
Paul Reeves, 78, New Zealand Anglican archbishop, Primate (1980–1985), Governor-General (1985–1990), cancer.
Friedrich Schoenfelder, 94, German actor.
Shawn Tompkins, 37, Canadian kickboxer and mixed martial artist, suspected heart attack.

15
Nenad Bijedić, 51, Bosnian football manager, cancer.
Colin Harvey, 50, British science fiction writer and editor, stroke.
Michael Legat, 88, British author and publisher.
Peter Mair, 60, Irish political scientist.
Solomon Mujuru, 62, Zimbabwean military officer and politician, injuries from a fire.
Wim Peeters, 85, South African Olympic shooter.
Hugo Perié, 67, Argentine politician, MP (since 2003), Montoneros militant, lung disease.
Sif Ruud, 95, Swedish actress.
Rick Rypien, 27, Canadian ice hockey player (Vancouver Canucks), suicide.
Tōru Shōriki, 92, Japanese baseball team owner (Tokyo Giants), sepsis.
Betty Thatcher, 67, British lyricist (Renaissance), cancer.

16
Vladimir Antakov, 54, Soviet Olympic hockey player.
Andrej Bajuk, 67, Slovenian politician and economist, Prime Minister (2000), stroke.
Mihri Belli, 96, Turkish politician and writer, respiratory failure.
Creed Black, 86, American newspaper publisher (Lexington Herald-Leader).
Huw Ceredig, 69, Welsh actor.
Albert Facchiano, 101, American mobster.
Akiko Futaba, 96, Japanese ryūkōka singer.
Ahmet Kıbıl, 58, Turkish Olympic skier.
Bruno Monti, 81, Italian Olympic cyclist.
Frank Munro, 63, Scottish footballer (Wolverhampton Wanderers F.C.), heart attack.
Pete Pihos, 87, American Hall of Fame football player (Philadelphia Eagles), Alzheimer's disease.
Leo Rodríguez, 82, Mexican baseball player.
Ramesh Saxena, 66, Indian cricketer, brain haemorrhage.
Bernard William Schmitt, 82, American Roman Catholic prelate, Bishop of Wheeling-Charleston (1989–2004).
Aud Talle, 65, Norwegian social anthropologist.

17
Augustus Aikhomu, 72, Nigerian admiral and politician, Vice President (1986–1993).
Hrach Bartikyan, 84, Armenian academician.
Vasyl Dzharty, 53, Ukrainian politician, Prime Minister of Crimea (since 2010), cancer.
Gualtiero Jacopetti, 91, Italian documentary film director.
Michel Mohrt, 97, French writer, member of the Académie française (since 1985).
Pierre Quinon, 49, French pole vaulter and Olympic champion (1984), suicide.
Bill Robinson, 72, New Zealand scientist.

18
John Bean, 48, Australian cinematographer, helicopter crash.
Samir Chanda, 53, Indian art film director, cardiac arrest.
Peter George Davis, 87, English Royal Marine officer,
Simon De Jong, 69, Canadian politician, MP for Regina East (1979–1988) and Regina—Qu'Appelle (1988–1997), leukemia.
Bill Gray, 88, American football player (Washington Redskins).
Johnson, 58, Indian film music composer, cardiac arrest.
Paul Lockyer, 61, Australian journalist, helicopter crash.
Herb Pfuhl, 83, American politician, longest-serving Mayor of Johnstown, Pennsylvania (1971–1977, 1982–1993).
Maurice M. Rapport, 91, American neuroscience biochemist.
Scotty Robertson, 81, American basketball coach (New Orleans Jazz, Chicago Bulls, Detroit Pistons), cancer.
Jerome J. Shestack, 88, American human rights activist and attorney, President of American Bar Association (1997–1998).
Jean Tabary, 81, French comic strip artist.
Norm Willey, 83, American football player (Philadelphia Eagles).

19
John Abley, 81, Australian football player, cardiac arrest.
Hendrina Afrikaner, 58-59, Namibian politician, car accident.
Merv Brooks, 92, Australian footballer.
Gil Courtemanche, 68, Canadian journalist and novelist (Un dimanche à la piscine à Kigali), cancer.
Gun Hägglund, 79, Swedish television personality, Sweden's first female television news presenter, after short illness.
Kerima Polotan Tuvera, 85, Filipino author and journalist.
Brian Pope, 100, English rugby union player.
Raúl Ruiz, 70, Chilean film director (Three Lives and Only One Death, Time Regained), pulmonary infection.
Jimmy Sangster, 83, British director and screenwriter (Hammer Films).
Vilem Sokol, 96, American conductor and music professor, cancer.
Vladimir Torban, 78, Soviet basketballer, 1956 Olympic silver medalist, two-times European champion.
Yevhen Yevseyev, 24, Ukrainian footballer, car accident.

20
George C. Axtell, 90, American military officer, United States Marine Corps lieutenant-general.
Reza Badiyi, 81, Iranian-born American television director (Mission: Impossible, The Six Million Dollar Man).
Ross Barbour, 82, American singer, last founding member of The Four Freshmen, lung cancer.
Fred Fay, 66, American leader in the disability rights movement.
Charles Gubser, 95, American politician, U.S. Representative from California (1953–1974).
Rafael Halperin, 87, Israeli businessman and professional wrestler.
Patricia Hardy, 79, American actress, colon cancer.
Chal Port, 80, American baseball coach (The Citadel).
Jethu Singh Rajpurohit, 90, Indian politician.
Angelo Maria Rivato, 86, Brazilian Roman Catholic prelate, Bishop of Ponta de Pedras (1967–2002).
Ram Sharan Sharma, 91, Indian historian.
Vernon Stratton, 83, British Olympic sailor.

21
Dharani Dhar Awasthi, 88, Indian botanist, taxonomist, and lichenologist.
Dame Christine Cole Catley, 88, New Zealand journalist, publisher and author, lung cancer.
Sir Donald Farquharson, 83, British jurist.
Patrick Guillemin, 60, French actor and voice actor, heart attack.
Brian Harrison, 89, Australian-born British politician and businessman, MP for Maldon (1955–1974).
Budd Hopkins, 80, American artist and UFO researcher, liver cancer.
John R. Hubbard, 92, American diplomat, President of University of Southern California (1970–1980), United States Ambassador to India (1988–1989).
John J. Kelley, 80, American Olympic long-distance runner, winner of the 1957 Boston Marathon.
Irène Pittelioen, 84, French Olympic gymnast.
Ezra Sued, 88, Argentine footballer (Racing Club de Avellaneda), infection.
Muga Takewaki, 67, Japanese actor, cerebrovascular disease.
Edith Tiempo, 92, Filipino author, National Artist of the Philippines, heart attack.

22
Atiyah Abd al-Rahman, 40, Libyan-born Afghan Al-Qaeda leader.
Abdul Aziz Abdul Ghani, 72, Yemeni politician, Prime Minister (1994–1997).
Ray Abruzzese, 73, American football player (Buffalo Bills, New York Jets).
Nickolas Ashford, 70, American R&B singer (Ashford & Simpson) and songwriter ("Ain't No Mountain High Enough"), throat cancer.
John Howard Davies, 72, English television producer and director (Fawlty Towers, The Good Life), former child actor (Oliver Twist), cancer.
Kamal el-Shennawi, 89, Egyptian actor.
Joan Gerber, 76, American voice actress (DuckTales).
Jesper Klein, 66, Danish actor, liver cancer.
Jack Layton, 61, Canadian politician, Leader of the Official Opposition (2011) and New Democratic Party (2003–2011), cancer.
Jerry Leiber, 78, American songwriter ("Stand By Me", "Hound Dog", "Jailhouse Rock"), cardiopulmonary failure.
Loriot, 87, German cartoonist and actor.
Samuel Menashe, 85, American poet, natural causes.
Žarko Nikolić, 74, Serbian footballer.
Casey Ribicoff, 88, American socialite and philanthropist, lung cancer.
Michael Showers, 45, American actor (Treme, The Vampire Diaries, The Tree of Life), drowned.
Thomas Syme, 83, British Olympic ice hockey player.

23
Akhtaruzzaman, 65, Bangladeshi film director.
J.C. Daniel, 84, Indian naturalist, lung cancer.
Paul Francis Duffy, 79, American-born Zambian Roman Catholic prelate, Bishop of Mongu (1997–2011).
Clare Hodges, 54, British campaigner for the medical use of cannabis, multiple sclerosis.
Sybil Jason, 83, American child actress.
David Lunn-Rockliffe, 86, British businessman co-founder of the River and Rowing Museum, heart failure.
Jim Peckham, 81, American Olympic wrestler.
Frank Potenza, 77, American police officer and actor (Jimmy Kimmel Live!), cancer.
Hasballah M. Saad, 63, Indonesian politician, Human Rights Minister (1999–2000).
Peter Terpeluk, Jr., 63, American diplomat, Ambassador to Luxembourg (2002–2005), heart attack.
June Wayne, 93, American artist and print maker.
Willie Williams, 86, American Negro league baseball player.

24
Frank DiLeo, 63, American music industry executive and actor (Goodfellas, Wayne's World), heart complications.
Esther Gordy Edwards, 91, American Motown executive, creator of Hitsville U.S.A. museum.
Seyhan Erözçelik, 49, Turkish poet.
Mike Flanagan, 59, American baseball player (Baltimore Orioles, Toronto Blue Jays), suicide by gunshot.
Frederick A. Fox, 80, American composer and music educator.
Jenő Gerbovits, 86, Hungarian politician, minister without portfolio (1990–1991), tractor accident.
Paul Harney, 82, American golfer.
Jack Hayes, 92, American composer and orchestrator (The Color Purple, The Unsinkable Molly Brown), natural causes.
Clemente Isnard, 94, Brazilian Roman Catholic prelate, Bishop of Nova Friburgo (1960–1992).
George Knight, 90, English footballer (Burnley).
Joyce McDougall, 91, New Zealand-French psychoanalyst.
Graeme Moody, 60, New Zealand sports broadcaster, drowned.
Yacoub Romanos, 76, Lebanese Olympic wrestler.
Alfons Van Brandt, 84, Belgian footballer.

25
Bandi Rajan Babu, 73, Indian photographer.
A. A. Birch, Jr., 78, American lawyer and judge, Chief Justice of the Tennessee Supreme Court.
Donna Christanello, 69, American professional wrestler, heart attack.
Jyles Coggins, 90, American politician, Mayor of Raleigh, North Carolina (1975–1977).
Elliott Johnston, 93, Australian jurist, Judge of the Supreme Court of South Australia (1983–1988).
Lazar Mojsov, 90, Macedonian politician, 10th. President of the Presidency of Yugoslavia (1987–1988).
Eugene Nida, 96, American linguist and bible translator.
Anne Sharp, 94, Scottish coloratura soprano.
Ruth Thomas, 84, British writer.

26
Aloysius Ambrozic, 81, Slovenian-born Canadian Roman Catholic cardinal, Archbishop of Toronto (1990–2006).
George Band, 82, British mountaineer.
C. K. Barrett, 94, British theologian.
Josephine Figlo, 88, American baseball player (AAGPBL).
Patrick C. Fischer, 75, American computer scientist and Unabomber target.
Susan Fromberg Schaeffer, 71, American novelist and educator, complications of a stroke.
John McAleese, 61, British SAS soldier involved in the Iranian Embassy Siege.
Elvis Reifer, 50, Barbadian cricketer.
Manuel Saavedra, 70, Chilean footballer
Donn A. Starry, 86, American army officer, Commanding General, TRADOC (1977–1981).
B. Jeff Stone, 75, American rockabilly singer-songwriter.
Nadine Winter, 87, American politician, member of the Council of the District of Columbia (1975–1991).

27
*Heribert Barrera, 94, Spanish politician, President of the Parliament of Catalonia (1980–1984).
Eve Brent, 82, American actress (The Green Mile, Garfield, Adam-12).
Frank Fanovich, 88, American baseball player (Cincinnati Reds, Philadelphia Athletics).
Lykourgos Kallergis, 97, Greek actor, director and politician.
Stetson Kennedy, 94, American folklorist and civil rights activist.
Kim Tai-chung, 54, Korean actor and martial artist, internal stomach bleeding.
Nico Minardos, 81, Greek actor (Istanbul, Twelve Hours to Kill, The Twilight Zone), natural causes.
John Parke, 74, Northern Irish footballer (Linfield, Hibernian, Sunderland, Northern Ireland), Alzheimer's disease.
Tapio Pöyhönen, 83, Finnish Olympic basketball player
Iya Savvina, 75, Russian actress, People's Artist of the USSR.
N. F. Simpson, 92, British dramatist.
Keith Tantlinger, 92, American mechanical engineer and inventor.
Pat Villani, 57, American computer programmer (FreeDOS)

28
Theo Blankenaauw, 87, Dutch track cyclist.
Billy Drake, 93, British fighter pilot.
Bernie Gallacher, 44, British footballer (Aston Villa).
Bruno Gamberini, 61, Brazilian Roman Catholic prelate, Archbishop of Campinas (since 2004).
Len Ganley, 68, Northern Irish snooker referee.
George Green, 59, American songwriter ("Hurts So Good", "Crumblin' Down"), lung cancer.
Leonard Harris, 81, American actor, arts and theater critic (WCBS-TV), complications of pneumonia.
Leonidas Kyrkos, 87, Greek politician, after short illness.
Dmitri Royster, 87, American hierarch (Orthodox Church in America), Archbishop of the Diocese of the South (1978–2009).
Tony Sale, 80, British computer scientist.
Necip Torumtay, 84/5, Turkish general, Chief of the General Staff (1987–1990).

29
Ebenezer Adam, 91-92, Ghanaian teacher and politician.
Pauline Morrow Austin, 94, American physicist and meteorologist.
Jim Baechtold, 83, American basketball player.
John Bancroft, 82, British architect.
David "Honeyboy" Edwards, 96, American blues guitarist and singer, heart failure.
Khamis Gaddafi, 28, Libyan seventh son of Muammar Gaddafi, commander of the Khamis Brigade, airstrike.
R. B. McDowell, 97, Irish historian.
Mark Ovendale, 37, English footballer (Luton Town, Bournemouth), cancer.
David P. Reynolds, 96, American businessman and Thoroughbred racehorse breeder.
George Sutor, 67, American basketball player.
Junpei Takiguchi, 80, Japanese voice actor and narrator (Dragon Ball, Yatterman, Mazinger Z), stomach cancer.
Ayala Zacks-Abramov, 99, Israeli art patron.

30
Alla Bayanova, 97, Russian singer, People's Artist of Russia, cancer.
Faye Blackstone, 96, American rodeo star, cancer.
Ronald N. Hartman, 76, American professor of astronomy, planetarium director (Mt. San Antonio College).
Revo Jõgisalu, 35, Estonian rapper, melanoma.
Peggy Lloyd, 98, American stage actress.
Wambui Otieno, 75, Kenyan politician.
João Carlos Batista Pinheiro, 79, Brazilian footballer, prostate cancer.
Cactus Pryor, 88, American broadcaster, Alzheimer's disease.

31
Paul Abisheganaden, 97, Singaporean music conductor and Cultural Medallion recipient.
Wade Belak, 35, Canadian ice hockey player (Toronto Maple Leafs, Nashville Predators), suicide.
Cal Christensen, 84, American basketball player (Milwaukee Hawks, Rochester Royals), heart failure.
Denis Collins, 58, Australian football player, heart attack.
Abderrahmane Mahjoub, 82, Moroccan-born French footballer.
Robert Muir, 91, Canadian politician, MP and Senator.
Dave Petrie, 64, Scottish politician, Member of the Scottish Parliament for Highlands and Islands (2006–2007).
Valery Rozhdestvensky, 72, Soviet cosmonaut.
Betty Skelton, 85, American aerobatics pilot and Women Airforce Service Pilots veteran.
Jack Stephens, 78, American basketball player (St. Louis Hawks).
Radoslav Stojanović, 81, Serbian politician and law expert (University of Belgrade), co-founder of the Democratic Party.
Peter Twiss, 90, British test pilot.
Rosel Zech, 69, German actress (Veronika Voss, Aimée & Jaguar), cancer.

References

2011-08
 08